Shabnam is a 1949 Hindi movie produced by Filmistan and directed by B. Mitra. The film stars Dilip Kumar, Kamini Kaushal, Jeevan and Shyama. The film's music is by S. D. Burman. When Indian film actor Manoj Kumar saw this movie at the age of 12-13, he was so impressed with Dilip Kumar's name that he decided to change his film name to Manoj Kumar if he ever became a film actor.

Cast
 Dilip Kumar as Manoj
 Kamini Kaushal as Shanti
 Jeevan
 Cuckoo
 Murad
 Paro
 Rajinder Singh
 Shyama

Crew
 Art - D. Malvanker
 Dance - Satyanarayan, N. Sharma
 Audiography - M. M. Kaka

Music 
Lyrics written by Qamar Jalalabadi.
 "Tumhare Liye Hue Badnam" – Shamshad Begum, Mukesh
 "Tu Mahal Me Rahne Wali" – Mukesh, Shamshad Begum
 "Qismat Men Bichhadanaa Thaa" – Geeta Dutt, Mukesh
 "Ik Baar Tu Ban Ja Mera O Pardesi" – Shamshad Begum
 "Kadar Meri Na Jani Chhod Ke Jane Wale" – Shamshad Begum
 "Pyar Me Tumne Dhokha Sikha" – Shamshad Begum, Mukesh
 "Mera Dil Tadpa Kar Kahan Chala" – Geeta Dutt
 "Duniya Rup Ki Chor Bacha Le Mere Babu" – Shamshad Begum
 "Hum Kisko Sunaye Haal" – Lalita Deulkar
 "Dekho Aayi Pehli Mohabbat Ki Raat" – Shamshad Begum

References

External links 
 

Films scored by S. D. Burman
Films scored by S. D. Batish
1949 films
1940s Hindi-language films
Indian black-and-white films
Indian romantic drama films
1949 romantic drama films